The samson fish (Seriola hippos) is a jack of the genus Seriola. It is found in the Indo-Pacific Oceans to eastern Northland in Australia. It is not found anywhere in New Zealand. Its length is between 80 and 150 cm.

References

 Fisheries Western Australia - Samson Fish Fact Sheet
 Tony Ayling & Geoffrey Cox, Collins Guide to the Sea Fishes of New Zealand,  (William Collins Publishers Ltd, Auckland, New Zealand 1982) 

Samson fish
Fish described in 1876
Taxa named by Albert Günther